Maene is a piano and harpsichord manufacturer based in Ruiselede, Belgium.

The company was founded by Albert Maene-Doutreloigne in 1938.

Projects of the company, under the direction of the son Chris Maene, include producing replicas of historical instruments (Walter, Steinway, ...) and developing new instruments like the Barenboim piano.

The company also provides keyboard instruments for competitions like the Queen Elisabeth Competition.

References

External links
 
 
 Daniel Barenboim designs 'radical' new piano at 

Piano manufacturing companies
Harpsichord manufacturing companies
Manufacturing companies established in 1938
Belgian brands
Musical instrument manufacturing companies of Belgium
Companies based in West Flanders
Belgian companies established in 1938